Willard D. "Wick" Rowland, Ph.D., is president and CEO emeritus of Colorado Public Television (KBDI/12), a PBS station in Denver, Colorado. He is professor emeritus and dean emeritus of the University of Colorado at Boulder.

Biography

Early life and education
Rowland, Jr. holds a BA in history from Stanford University, an MA in communication from the Annenberg School for Communication at the University of Pennsylvania, and a Ph.D. from the Institute for Communications Research at the University of Illinois at Urbana-Champaign. He was conferred as dean emeritus and professor emeritus by University of Colorado at Boulder and is a research scholar in the fields of public broadcasting in the US, mass communications and violence in the media. He attended the Catlin-Gabel school in Portland, Oregon and graduated from the St. Paul's School in Concord, New Hampshire.

Most recently, Rowland was granted a Fulbright Specialist placement in the field of broadcasting, media policy development and communication/journalism education in Ethiopia.

Rowland served as a Peace Corps volunteer in Jamaica  working in instructional broadcasting and adult literacy projects. “I wasn’t on the ground more than three weeks before I realized that I needed a much deeper education in media and development policy. The then ‘dominant paradigm’ didn’t explain much of what I was experiencing in the Jamaican bush. Coming to Annenberg gave me a chance to begin developing a whole new, more critical and culturally conscious approach to media history and policy issues, particularly with regard to public service questions."

Career
Rowland served as dean of the University of Colorado at Boulder School of Journalism and Mass Communication from 1987 to 1999. He was conferred as dean emeritus and professor emeritus status by the University of Colorado. In August 1999, he was named president  of KBDI/12. Rowland was named "Television Person of the Year" by "The Denver Post" for 2010.

Rowland was the first vice-president of research during the early days of PBS. That is where he coined the phrase "closed-captioning" for the newly developed process for transmitting the written word on a television screen for the hearing impaired.

In the world of public media, Rowland is considered a robust scholar and research "critic" of public broadcasting in the United States and is known for his policy vision and his more ambitious goals for the current status quo of CPB and PBS. Some might even say that he has developed the point-counterpoint white paper and answer to PBS' and CPB's viewpoints and questions with the numerous articles and published works in academic journals. He has written for almost thirty years about the leadership and funding gaps in public broadcasting in the US vis-a-vis the rest of the Western World. Rowland has pointedly critiqued the lack of a permanent endowment for public broadcasting and the softness of the Washington hierarchy to better represent PBS and NPR stations to Congress.

To that point in Variety on January 22, 2011 he was quoted as saying, "You're spending a great deal of political capital on the Hill just to keep what you've got, instead of being able to look ahead to growing the pie. That's probably the most serious and misunderstood consequence of these periodic bouts that we have. I used to think that they were just periodic events of no significance, but now I think it's a way of keeping a lid on (us)."

From the editors of the publication Current, October 2010: Wick Rowland, an early PBS planner and now a station leader in Colorado, said that public broadcasting’s failure to put time and money into formal research and planning has left it "adrift, mute and helpless" on the periphery of federal policymaking about media and spectrum. Pubcasting was slow to respond to the journalism crisis, aloof from the Obama administration’s big commitment to give the public universal access to broadband Internet service.

Despite such successes, Rowland is quick to note that public broadcasting is facing serious challenges. “While we know that the public highly values our services, the new digital media and the recent economic difficulties have combined to threaten all our forms of support. Much of the way we do business will have to change.”

Despite those challenges he remains passionate about the mission of public media and their prospects. “We’ve got to keep up the good fight, finding alternatives to marketplace-based programming and the lowest common denominator of media service. Our society requires a major media system dedicated to core civic purposes. Already, even the new social media, which were supposed to be the harbinger of a new, more democratic capacity, are quickly becoming commercialized. The big question is -- will we be able to find forms of support in the broadband world to sustain well-investigated reporting and a wide range of media content that reflects the best of our great republic?”  "Transforming Public Broadcasting the Annenberg Way"

In his writings, he suggests how the system could equip itself to develop a more coherent, visionary agenda for its own future and the nation’s media policies." Rowland testified before Congress in February 2009 about the Satellite Home Viewing Extension Reauthorization Act (SHVERA) on behalf of PBS.

Published works

"Adrift, Mute and Helpless: Why Everyone But Public Broadcasters is Making Federal Policy for Public Media" "Current": Part One, October 18, 2010
The Illusion of Fulfillment (Association for Education in Journalism and Mass Communication, 1982)
The Politics of TV Violence (Sage, 1983)
Interpreting Television with Bruce Watkins (Sage, 1984)
The Challenges to Public Service Broadcasting (Aspen Institute Berlin, 1986)
"Shadows in the Corridors: A Capitol Hill Day dialogue" (article in  Current, February 12, 2007)
"Leadership in Times of Change: Media Education," (Lawrence Erlbaum 1999
 Palmeri, Hélène and Rowland, Willard. "Public television in a time of technological change and socioeconomic turmoil : the cases of France and the U.S. Part I. Looking back : the theory, the promise and the contradictions."  International Journal of Communication, 2011.
 Palmeri, H. and Rowland, W. "Public television in a time of technological change and socioeconomic turmoil : the case of France and the U.S. Part II. New "reforms" and the prospects : looking ahead." International Journal of Communication, 2011.

Awards
2006: Colorado Broadcast Citizen of the Year, Colorado Broadcasters Association
2009: Advocacy Award, Association of America's Public Television Stations
2010: Television Person of the Year, Denver Post

References 

Year of birth missing (living people)
Living people
American television executives
University of Colorado faculty
Stanford University alumni
Annenberg School for Communication at the University of Pennsylvania alumni
University of Illinois alumni